Marsoulas is a commune in the Haute-Garonne department in southwestern France.

It is notable for the Marsoulas Cave in which palæolithic artifacts and paintings were discovered.

Population

See also
Communes of the Haute-Garonne department

References

Communes of Haute-Garonne